Ritzing is a former commune in the Moselle department in Grand Est in north-eastern France. On 1 January 2019, it was merged into the new commune Manderen-Ritzing.

See also

 Communes of the Moselle department

References

Former communes of Moselle (department)